Roseburg is an unincorporated community in Liberty Township, Union County, in the U.S. state of Indiana.

Geography

References

Unincorporated communities in Union County, Indiana
Unincorporated communities in Indiana